Paramathi-Velur may refer to:
 Paramathi Velur town
 Paramathi-Velur taluk
 Paramathi-Velur (state assembly constituency)